Antonio José Colorado Laguna (born September 8, 1939) is an American lawyer and politician from New York. He served as Secretary of State of Puerto Rico and Resident Commissioner of Puerto Rico for the administration of Rafael Hernández Colón.

Biography

Colorado attended elementary and high school in Puerto Rico. In 1962, he earned a bachelor's degree from Boston University and three years later graduated from the University of Puerto Rico at Rio Piedras with a Juris Doctor. In 1966, he earned a master of Laws from the Harvard Law School and was admitted to the Puerto Rican bar.  He is a member of Phi Sigma Alpha fraternity.

From 1966 to 1968 he served as legal tax adviser to the Puerto Rico Economic Development Administration, and from 1968 to 1969 he served as the executive assistant to the economic development administrator of Puerto Rico. He began a law practice in 1969, and became a member of the Puerto Rico Tax Reform Commission Subcommittee in 1973.

In the late 1970s, in addition to his law practice, he lectured at both the University of Puerto Rico at Rio Piedras and the Interamerican University of Puerto Rico. In 1985, then Governor of Puerto Rico, Rafael Hernández Colón, appointed Colorado to the post of administrator of economic development. From 1990 to 1992 he served as Secretary of State for Puerto Rico.

In 1992, Colorado was appointed Resident Commissioner to fill the vacancy caused by the resignation of Jaime B. Fuster, who was appointed associate justice of the Supreme Court of Puerto Rico. In the United States House of Representatives Colorado tried to address problems faced by Puerto Ricans, such as crime and drug abuse, and requested additional medicaid support for the Island.

He was unsuccessful in his 1992 bid for election and returned to San Juan, Puerto Rico. He currently serves as Executive Director of the Local Redevelopment Authority for the former Roosevelt Roads Naval Station in Ceiba, Puerto Rico, a facility that was abandoned by the United States Navy after naval shelling practices ended in nearby Vieques, Puerto Rico.

See also
 List of Hispanic Americans in the United States Congress

External links

Hispanic Americans in Congress: Antonio J. Colorado

References

|-

1939 births
Boston University alumni
Democratic Party members of the United States House of Representatives from Puerto Rico
Harvard Law School alumni
Living people
Resident Commissioners of Puerto Rico
Secretaries of State of Puerto Rico
University of Puerto Rico alumni